Tristano Alessandro Casanova (born 13 October 1983) is a German actor and voice actor.

Early life 
Casanova was born in Munich to Italian and American parents.

Filmography 
 1993: Himmel und Hölle
 1994: 110 Unterwegs im Streifenwagen  
 1996: Ausflug in den Schnee
 1996: Emmeran 
 2000: Der Runner
 2000: Die Nacht der Engel
 2000: Vater wider Willen
 2001: Jenny & Co
 2002: Verlorenes Land
 2003: Die Stimmen
 2003: Skifahren unter Wasser
 2004: Sommersturm
 2004: Stärker als der Tod 
 2005: Gefühlte Temperatur
 2006: Liebe, Babys und ein großes Herz

External links 
 

1983 births
Living people
German male television actors
German male film actors
German male stage actors
German male voice actors
German male child actors
Male actors from Munich
German people of American descent
German people of Italian descent